FVHS may refer to:

 Forest View High School, a defunct school in Arlington Heights, Illinois, United States
 Forest View High School, New Zealand, in Tokoroa
 Fort Vancouver High School in Vancouver, Washington, United States
 Fountain Valley High School in Fountain Valley, California, United States
 Franklin Virtual High School, an American private online school
 Fuquay-Varina High School in Fuquay-Varina, North Carolina, United States

See also 
 FVH (disambiguation)